Alejandro Brodersohn (born in Buenos Aires) is an Argentine film editor.

Some of the films he has edited have been critically well received: Buenos Aires Vice Versa, (1996) Whisky Romeo Zulu (2004), 18-j (2004), and El Abrazo partido (2004).

Filmography
 Buenos Aires Vice Versa (1996) a.k.a. Buenos Aires Vice Versa
 Moebius (1996)
 La Cruz (1997)
 Fantasmas en la Patagonia (1997)
 Evita, una tumba sin paz (1997) a.k.a. Evita: The Unquiet Grave
 Mala época (1998)
 El Viento se llevó lo qué (1998) a.k.a. Wind with the Gone
 Los Libros y la noche (1999) a.k.a. The Books and the Night
 Río escondido (1999) a.k.a. Hidden River
 El Nadador inmóvil (2000)
 Ciudad de María (2002) a.k.a. Mary's City
 El C.A.I.N.A.: Los chicos de la calle (2002)
 Valentín (2002) a.k.a. Valentin
 El Cielito (2004) a.k.a. Little Sky
 Whisky Romeo Zulu (2004)
 Un Mundo menos peor (2004) a.k.a. A Less Bad World
 18-j (2004)
 El Abrazo partido (2004) a.k.a. Lost Embrace
 Iluminados por el fuego (2005) a.k.a. Blessed by Fire
 Mientras tanto (2006)
 Fuerza aérea sociedad anónima (2006)
 The Lake House (2006)

Television
 Okupas (2000) TV Series
 Querida Mara (2001) (TV) a.k.a. Cartas de un viaje por la Patagonia

External links
 
 

Argentine film editors
Living people
People from Buenos Aires
1969 births